Prospekt's March is the seventh EP by British rock band Coldplay and their first since Remixes (2003). It came out on 21 November 2008 in Europe and Japan, enjoying a worldwide release during the following week. The EP features several left-over tracks from the Viva la Vida or Death and All His Friends studio sessions and was also made available in the album's deluxe edition.

The cover features Eugène Delacroix's original painting Battle of Poitiers, similar to the cover art featured on Viva la Vida, which included another Delacroix painting, Liberty Leading the People. On 5 November, Coldplay offered an exclusive preview of the EP via their Facebook application and through their website. The song "Glass of Water" was released in anticipation for the project and entered the iTunes Top 100 songs, being also performed live by the band on 4Music. 

Upon the EP's release, "Life in Technicolor II" entered the UK Singles Chart at number 90 despite not being a promotional effort. The band would later confirm the song as an official single and release its physical version on 8 February 2009, which made the track rise to a new peak of number 28. One year later, it was nominated for the 52nd Grammy Awards in the Best Rock Performance by a Duo or Group with Vocal and Best Short Form Music Video categories.

Recording and release

Throughout the recording of Viva la Vida or Death and All His Friends, Coldplay communicated to fans through their website, and some of the song titles were revealed during the recording. The name "Poppyfields" was first revealed in September 2007; in late October 2007, a message said that "Famous Old Painters" and "Glass of Water" had been written and were being considered for the album. "Prospekt's March" appeared for the first time in December of the same year; all the notes were signed by the pseudonym Prospekt, strengthening rumours that this would be the album's title. Those songs did not make it to the album's final track listing, so were featured on the Prospekt's March EP, except for "Famous Old Painters", which was never released.

In an interview for Coldplay's official website, frontman Chris Martin said that all the songs on the EP came very close to inclusion on Viva la Vida, and that they were "all part of the same family". In the same interview, the frontman stated that the idea was always to put these songs out by the end of 2008. Coldplay confirmed five songs for Prospekt's March on 3 October 2008, all of which had not been completed in time for Viva la Vida or Death and All His Friends. The playlist was changed to eight songs on 5 October. Six of the eight tracks are new recordings of the band.

Chart performance
Prospekt's March debuted at number 15 on the Billboard 200 with 77,000 copies sold.

Track listing
All songs written by Coldplay (Guy Berryman, Jonny Buckland, Will Champion and Chris Martin), except "Lost+", which was co-written by Shawn Carter.

Personnel

Andy Rugg – assistant engineer, engineer
Andy Wallace – mixing
Bob Ludwig – mastering
Brian Eno – producer, sonic landscapes
Brian Thorn – assistant engineer, engineer
Chris Martin – performer
Dan Green – assistant engineer, engineer, photography
Dave Holmes – management
Davide Rossi – strings
Dominic Monks – assistant engineer, engineer
Emily Bart-Smith – additional vocals on "Rainy Day"
Eugène Delacroix – cover painting
François Chevallier – assistant engineer, engineer
Guy Berryman – performer
Jan Petrov – assistant engineer, engineer
Jason Lader – assistant engineer, engineer

Jay-Z – additional vocal on "Lost+"
Jonny Buckland – performer
Jon Hopkins – lightning, magic
Kelly Pratt – brass
Markus Dravs – mixing, producer
Michael Brauer – mixing
Michael Trepagnier – assistant engineer, engineer
Olga Fitzroy – assistant engineer, engineer
Phil Harvey – performer
Rik Simpson – mixing, producer
Stephan Crasneanscki – photography
Tappin Gofton – art direction, design
Vanessa Parr – assistant engineer, engineer
Will Champion – performer
William Paden Hensley – assistant engineer, engineer
Young Guru – additional engineering on "Lost+"

Charts and certifications

Charts

Certifications

Release history

References

External links
 

Coldplay EPs
2008 EPs
Parlophone EPs
Concept albums
Albums produced by Brian Eno
Albums produced by Rik Simpson